Sauce chasseur, sometimes called "hunter's sauce", is a simple or compound brown sauce used in French cuisine. It is typically made using demi-glace or espagnole sauce (among the five mother sauces) as a base, and often includes mushrooms and shallots. It may also include tomatoes and a finishing of fines herbes.

History 
The name is derived from the French word for "hunter", alluding to the traditional pairings with venison, rabbit, wild fowl, and other game meats. Traditionally, while returning from the hunt, the hunters would pick the mushrooms that they would subsequently use for their preparation.

Chasseur is thought to have been invented by Philippe de Mornay, who is also credited with inventing Mornay sauce, Béchamel, sauce Lyonnaise, and sauce Porto.

See also

 Brown sauce
 Cacciatore
 Coq au vin
 Hunter's chicken

References

Brown sauces
French sauces
Wild game dishes